Aberdeen, Scotland is a city located between the River Dee and the River Don.

Climate

The wettest months are October and November.

Demographics
Education:
Educationally Aberdeen has a higher student rate than the national average of 11.5% compared with 7% nationally.

Household:
In the household, there were 97,013 individual dwellings recorded in the city of which 61% were privately owned, 9% privately rented and 23% rented from the council. The most popular type of dwellings are apartments which have 49% of residences followed by semi-detached at just below 22%.

Income
The average income of a household in the city is £16,813 (2005) which places about 18% households in the city below the poverty line (defined as 60% of the mean income).

Population:
In 1396 the population was about 3,000. By 1801 it had become 26,992; in 1841 it was 63,262; (1891) 121,623; (1901) 153,503; (1941) 182,467.  In 2001 it UK census records the Aberdeen City Council areas population at 212,125, but the Aberdeen locality's population at 184,788. The latest official population estimate, published by the General Register for Scotland for 2005, is 202,370.

Data from the Aberdeen specific locality of the 2001 UK census shows that the demographics include a median male age of 35 and female age of 38 which are younger than Scotland's average and a 49% to 51% male to female ratio.

It also showed that there are fewer young people in Aberdeen, with 16.4% under 16, opposed to the national average of 19.2%. Ethnically, 15.7% were born outside Scotland, higher than the national average of 12.9%. Of this population 8.4% were born in England. 3% of Aberdonians are considered to be from an ethnic minority (non-white), with 0.7% from the Indian-subcontinent and 0.6% Asian.

Religion:
The last census revealed that Aberdeen is the least religious city in Scotland, with nearly 43% of people claiming to have no religion.

Topography
The city is built on many hills, with the original beginnings of the city growing from Castle Hill, St. Catherine's Hill and Windmill Hill (also known as the Gallowgate).

Reference tables

Temperature

Precipitation

Other Data

Population Data

See also
Demographics of Scotland
General Register Office for Scotland; collects data and statistics, including Scotland's Census data
United Kingdom Census 2001; this page has links to other regions census data in the UK
Met Office; the government owned UK weather service with detailed climate information

References

External links
Scottish Census 2001 Results
Aberdeen City Council Statistics